The 1951 FA Cup final was contested by Newcastle United and Blackpool at Wembley on 28 April 1951. Newcastle won 2–0, with both goals scored by Jackie Milburn.

Bill Slater, who played at inside left for losers Blackpool, was the last surviving player to have appeared in the final. He died in December 2018 at the age of 91. The last surviving Newcastle United player from the final was Charlie Crowe, who died in February 2010 at the age of 85.

Match details

Broadcasting
Radio listeners around the nation could tune in to hear the match on the BBC light programme with commentary from Raymond Glendenning. However, only the second half of the match was televised by the BBC with commentary from Jimmy Jewell, his last cup final before his death the following year, and Kenneth Wolstenholme. The Television footage has since been lost.

References

External links
Match report at www.fa-cupfinals.co.uk
FA Cup Final lineups

FA Cup Finals
FA Cup Final
FA Cup Final 1951
FA Cup Final 1951
FA Cup Final
FA Cup Final